Qarzi (also Romanized as Qārẕī and Qārzī) is a village in Safiabad Rural District, Bam and Safiabad District, Esfarayen County, North Khorasan Province, Iran. At the 2006 census, its population was 196, in 47 families.

References 

Populated places in Esfarayen County